"On the Road" is a song recorded by Bryan Adams. It was first released on November 29, 2021 is the second single from the album So Happy It Hurts. The song written specifically for the 2022 Pirelli Calendar of which Adams is the author.

Background
The song is a tribute to the return to the road of a musician after the long period of hiatus at events and musical performances and concerts due to the COVID-19 pandemic. Describing the song and the calendar, he also said:"On the road is where I have been for the last 45 years," Adams said in the statement, "because the life of a musician is made up of roads, travel, waiting in hotels, hours backstage."
On The Road is the title of the 48th edition of the Pirelli 2022 calendar. During the presentation of the calendar, which took place in Milan on November 29, 2021, Adams explained how the idea for the song was born after the shooting advent in Las Vegas in the summer of 2021, he contacted the Pirelli executives saying that he had in mind to write a song for the calendar, with our approval and enthusiasm Adams together with Robert John "Mutt" Lange wrote in just 24 hours.

Music video
The video of the song was directed by Adams, was made in an adjacent street on The Warehouse Studio in Vancouver.

Credits and personnel

Song 
 Bryan Adams — lead and backing vocals, drums, hammond organ, percussion, guitars, bass, songwriter, producer
 Robert John "Mutt" Lange — backing vocals, songwriter, producer
 Hayden Watson — recording engineer
 Olle Romo — recording engineer
 Emily Lazar — recording engineer
 Chris Allgood — recording engineer

Video 
 Bryan Adams — director

References

2021 singles
2021 songs
Bryan Adams songs
Songs written by Bryan Adams
BMG Rights Management singles
Songs about the COVID-19 pandemic
Songs written by Robert John "Mutt" Lange